Alfamén is a municipality located in the province of Zaragoza, Aragon, Spain. According to the 2016 census (INE), the municipality has a population of 1,466 inhabitants Its demonym is vena. This town is reputed for its Melons and watermelons.

There are ruins of an ancient Iberian settlement in the Cabezo de Altomira hill, located about 4 km NE of the town.

See also
Campo de Cariñena
List of municipalities in Zaragoza

References

External links 

Ayuntamiento de Alfamén - Alfamén
Cabezo Altomira. Alfamén, Guía Práctica

Municipalities in the Province of Zaragoza